Rok Perko (born June 10, 1985) is a former Slovenian alpine ski racer. He was born in Kranj, and specialized in downhill, super-G and combined.

Career 
His best career result was a 2nd place in World Cup downhill in Val Gardena, Italy. In 2010 Winter Olympics – Men's downhill he took 14th place. He also competed in three different FIS Alpine World Ski Championships where he didn't have any bigger success.

World Cup results

Season standings

Race podiums
 1 podium - (1 DH)

References

External links
  
 
 
 

Living people
1985 births
Slovenian male alpine skiers
Olympic alpine skiers of Slovenia
Alpine skiers at the 2010 Winter Olympics
Sportspeople from Kranj
Alpine skiers at the 2014 Winter Olympics